China National Highway 205 (G205) runs from Shanhaiguan, Hebei Province to Shenzhen, Guangdong. It is 3,160 kilometres in length and runs south from Shanhaiguan towards Tianjin, Hebei, Shandong, Jiangsu, Anhui, Zhejiang, Fujian, and ends in Guangdong Province.

Route and distance

See also 

 China National Highways

Transport in Hebei
Transport in Jiangsu
Transport in Shandong
Transport in Guangdong
Transport in Fujian
Transport in Anhui
Transport in Zhejiang
Road transport in Tianjin
205